WGSN  is a trend forecasting company of parent organisation Ascential. WGSN was founded in 1998 in West London by brothers Julian and Marc Worth. Emap (now Ascential), a business-to-business publisher and exhibitions company, bought the company  in October 2005 for £140m.

Recent history
In 2013, WGSN merged with its biggest competitor, Stylesight. Like WGSN, Stylesight had a vast library of fashion forecasting, trend information, archival photos, and even sketches and patterns for designers to use. Keeping the WGSN name, the new product has been designed around the technology developed by Stylesight and launched in 2014.

In February 2016, Ascential plc, an international media company that includes WGSN in its portfolio, was the subject of an £800m initial public offering.

Products 
As an online service, the business derives its revenues from six different product subscriptions (WGSN Insight, WGSN Fashion, WGSN Lifestyle & Interiors, WGSN Barometer, WGSN Instock, WGSN Styletrial), a custom advisory business (WGSN Mindset) and a global series of events (WGSN Futures).

See also 
Coolhunting
Extrapolation
Technology forecasting

References

External links

Ascential
Forecasting
Companies based in New York City
Cultural trends
Market research organizations
Street fashion